Sheikh Zainuddin or Shaikh Zain-al-Din ( fl.  1777–1782) was an artist of the East India Company period who moved from Patna to Calcutta and rose to prominence under European patronage in British Raj. His works blending Mughal and Western painting techniques belonged to the Company style of painting.

Career 
In the late eighteenth century, he worked under Mary Impey, the wife of Sir Elijah Impey, Chief Justice of Calcutta Supreme Court. Among the three artists she brought from Patna to make realistic sketches of birds and animals of her private menagerie, Zainuddin was the foremost. Zainuddin combined English botanical illustration with Mughal Patna Qalam style. In his paintings, modern critics appreciate the way a "bright, simple background offsets the keenly wrought details of plants and animals".

From 1777 to 1782, Zainuddin worked on Whiteman art paper manufactured in England for his transparent watercolor paintings. For his tinted drawings and sketches, he employed meticulous calligraphic strokes reminiscent of the works of Mughal Court artist Ustad Mansur. His drawings of mountain-rats, hanging bats, parrots, and storks are distinctive for having both aesthetic appeal and scientific value. These are now preserved in the Ashmolean Museum in Oxford.

Exhibitions 
Zainuddin's work was first exhibited in 2016 at the Royal Albert Memorial Museum in Exeter, as part of the Flower Power exhibition. At that point his name, written in an old hand-writing was taken to be "Jack Joyenadey." Since then, researchers working together with the museum staff, have deciphered his name. The updated exhibition is online.
Subsequently, Zainuddin's work was exhibited in 2019 at London's Wallace Collection, along with that of 17 other artists commissioned by the British East India Company. The director of the Wallace Collection, Xavier Bray, told Smithsonian that in Zainuddin's paintings, "Everything is incredibly precise and beautifully observant."

References

External links

Year of birth missing
Year of death missing
18th-century Indian painters
Indian male painters